The Real Me is the debut album by the Filipino actress Bea Alonzo. It was released on 2008 by Star Records.

Release
The album was launched on June 18 in the daily talk show Boy & Kris. In the show, Bea Alonzo sang two tracks from her album.

Track listing

Awards

 2009 Waki OPM Music Awards as Breakout Star of 2008 (I'm Missing You)
 2009 Waki OPM Music Awards as Listener's Choice Award (Female)

References

2008 debut albums